Laundering may refer to:

 Money laundering, disguising the origin of illegally gained wealth
 Doing laundry, or washing clothes
 Child laundering, the illegal acquisition of children through monetary transactions, etc.
 Policy laundering, disguising the origin of legislation

See also 

 List of laundry articles